Lamb's fry is lamb offal served as food, including the testicles, liver,  sweetbreads, heart, kidneys, and sometimes the brain and abdominal fat—or some combination thereof.<ref>Oxford English Dictionary, s.v.</ref>M.L. Tyson, The Queen of the Kitchen: A Collection of Southern Cooking Receipts, 1886, p. 136

In Australia and New Zealand, lamb's fry is specifically the liver; in the United States, "lamb fries" (q.v.) are specifically the testicles. In the U.K., it was all offal, though recently testicle has become rare.

HistoryWalker's Hibernian Magazine mentions "breakfasts of nice stew'd lamb's fry" eaten on the day of Swanhop in 1786. In 1929, a Country Life'' cookery supplement described it as an "old Devon breakfast dish". Fanny Cradock wrote that it was once popular as a breakfast dish before World War II.

Preparation
Lamb's fry is typically sliced, breaded, and pan-fried, and served with bacon, onions and a gravy made with the juices. The oldest known published recipe of this type is from 1808.

Popularity
"Lamb's fry and bacon" was once very popular as pub food and still relatively popular in Australia as pub counter meals and as a breakfast dish. This meal is making a comeback in the form of a healthy, high iron "slow food"-type dish

See also
 List of lamb dishes

References

Australian cuisine
Lamb dishes